Bunchosia jamaicensis is a species of plant in the Malpighiaceae family. It is endemic to Jamaica.

References

jamaicensis
Vulnerable plants
Endemic flora of Jamaica
Taxonomy articles created by Polbot